In 1955, Pope Pius XII made several changes to the General Roman Calendar of 1954; those changes remained in force until 1960, when Pope John XXIII decreed a new revision of the General Roman Calendar (see General Roman Calendar of 1960). The changes made by Pope Pius XII thus remained unaltered for only five years.

Pius XII made those changes by the decree "Cum nostra hac aetate" of 23 March 1955.

Rank of feasts
The grade and rite of "Semi-Double" was suppressed, and the liturgical days formerly celebrated as that rite were to be celebrated in the simple rite except the Vigil of Pentecost which was raised to the double rite.

Sundays
The Sundays of Advent and Lent and those that follow up to Low Sunday, and also Pentecost Sunday, were to be celebrated as doubles of the first class, outranking all feasts; but when feasts of the first class occurred on the second, third or fourth Sunday of Advent, Masses of the feast were permitted except the conventual Mass. Sundays previously celebrated in the Semi-Double rite were raised to the Double rite. An impeded Sunday Office and Mass was to be neither anticipated nor resumed. A feast or title or any mystery of Our Lord falling on a Sunday per annum was thenceforth to take the place of the Sunday, with the latter merely commemorated.

Vigils
The Vigil of the Nativity of the Lord and the vigil of Pentecost were privileged vigils. The Vigils of the Ascension of Our Lord, the Assumption of the Blessed Virgin Mary, Saint John the Baptist, Saints Peter and Paul and Saint Lawrence were to be common vigils and, if they occurred on a Sunday, were not to be anticipated, but simply omitted. All other vigils, including those marked in particular calendars, were suppressed.

Octaves
Only the Octaves of Easter, Christmas and Pentecost were to be celebrated; all others occurring either in the universal or in particular calendars were suppressed. The days within the Easter and Pentecost octaves were raised to the Double rite, had precedence over all feasts, and did not admit commemorations. But the days of the Octave of Christmas, although of the Double rite, continued to be celebrated as before.

From 2 to 5 January, unless some feast occurred, the Office was to be of the current feria in the simple rite. The Mass was to be the same as that of 1 January but without the Credo and the special "Communicantes".

With the suppression of the Octave of Epiphany, the days from 7 to 12 January became feriae per annum (in the Simple rite); up to the Sunday following Epiphany, the Mass was to be the same as that of the Epiphany, but without the Credo and without the special "Communicantes"; after the Sunday, the mass was to be that of the Sunday (which on that Sunday itself remained continually impeded by the Feast of the Holy Family). On 13 January the Commemoration of the Baptism of our Lord was to be celebrated in the major double rite, using for the Office and the Mass those previously said on the Octave of the Epiphany. But if 13 January occurred on Sunday, the Office and Mass were to be those of the "Feast of the Holy Family" without any commemoration of the Baptism of Our Lord.

The days from the Ascension of Our Lord to the Vigil of Pentecost exclusive became feriae of Eastertide (in the Simple rite); the Mass was to be that of the Feast of the Ascension, but without the Credo and the special Communicantes (even on the Friday before Pentecost, where hitherto the Mass of the Sunday had to be taken). The days of the suppressed Octaves of Corpus Christi and the Most Sacred Heart of Jesus became feriae per annum.

Feasts of the Saints
Saints' feasts previously celebrated in the Semi-Double rite were to be treated as Simple feasts, and those previously celebrated in the Simple rite were reduced to a commemoration. If any feast not of the first or second class occurred on the ferias of Lent and Passiontide, from Ash Wednesday to the Saturday before Palm Sunday, the Office (if recited privately) and the Mass could be either of the feria or of the feast.

Changes related to St. Joseph and others
By a separate decree of the same year 1955, Pope Pius XII instituted the feast of "Saint Joseph the Worker" on 1 May (moving the feast of "Saints Philip and James Apostles" from 1 May, where it had been since the sixth century, to 11 May, and suppressing the "Solemnity of Saint Joseph, Spouse of the Blessed Virgin Mary" that, since Pope Pius IX's decree of 10 September 1847, had been celebrated on the second Wednesday after the Octave of Easter).

See also
General Roman Calendar
Tridentine Calendar
General Roman Calendar of 1954
General Roman Calendar of 1960
General Roman Calendar of 1969

References

Liturgical calendars of the Catholic Church
Tridentine Mass
Canon law history
Pope Pius XII